The Gateway Program is a C$3.0 billion  regional transportation project for Metro Vancouver that is being managed by the British Columbia Ministry of Transportation. The ministry introduced the Gateway Program on January 31, 2006, as a means to address growing congestion and reduce travel times.

Port Mann / Highway 1
The Port Mann / Highway 1 (PMH1) Project includes the widening of Highway 1, a new Port Mann Bridge, and upgrades to interchanges on British Columbia Highway 1 in order to address congestion through this corridor.

The Port Mann Bridge was replaced with a new 10-lane tolled bridge. On September 1, 2017, the toll was removed.

The project will also feature rapid bus lanes. This will include transit priority access to Highway 1, park-and-ride facilities, new transit loops in Surrey and Langley, and 20 new buses.

The bridge will include separated pedestrian and cycling lanes and is also designed to accommodate the eventual addition of light rail transit underneath the bridge.

The project includes widening Highway 1 between McGill Street in Vancouver and 216 Street in Langley. The pre-design concept included one additional lane in each direction between the Port Mann Bridge and McGill Street. The bridge itself features five new lanes, two reserved for high-occupancy vehicles and commercial vehicles. On the Surrey side, four additional lanes will be built from the bridge to 200 Street, allowing for an HOV and general lane in each direction. Finally, there will be one additional lane in each direction on the section from 200 to 216 Streets.

Interchanges from Vancouver to Langley will also be upgraded to increase interchange capacity and improve safety.

The majority of these changes will occur within the existing right of way of Highway 1. The PMH1 project was completed in September 2015.

Golden Ears Way

 For info on the Golden Ears Way, see Golden Ears Way.

South Fraser Perimeter Road
The South Fraser Perimeter Road (SFPR), a new four-lane, 80 km/h (50 mph) highway along the south side of the Fraser River, extends from Highway 17 in southwest Delta to 176 Street in Surrey, with connections to Highways 1, 91, and 99 and to TransLink's new Golden Ears Bridge connector. The SFPR provides a new east–west transportation corridor that connects to the Roberts Bank Superport. The stated goal is to reduce the volume of regional truck traffic on local roads and reduce idling on local roads.

The Burns Bog Conservation Society has expressed concerns that the South Fraser Perimeter Road will endanger Burns Bog. Attempts to mitigate these impacts have been made through refinements that occurred as a result of public consultation and the Environmental Assessment process. In response to the mitigation measures proposed, the Environmental Stewardship Branch of Environment Canada wrote that "the changes are not sufficient to alleviate its concerns related to the impacts of the Project on Pacific Water Shrew (PWS), hydrology, aerial deposition, and ecological integrity of Burns Bog".

The Gateway Program says that it is committed to protecting and supporting the restoration of Burns Bog. The SFPR project will be working with the Burns Bog Scientific Advisory Panel to develop systems that will improve the existing drainage and hydrology of the bog. Although the SFPR alignment does not pass through the Burns Bog Ecological Conservancy Area, there is concern that it will affect the surrounding hydrology and have an adverse effect on the Conservancy Area.

It is estimated that over 90 hectares (222 acres) of farmland will also be lost to the project. Concerns have also been expressed about pollution near residential neighborhoods and schools.

The Wilderness Committee and other groups have criticized the SFPR, and the Gateway Program in general, for increasing greenhouse gas emissions. In the spring of 2011, a protest camp organized by StopThePave.org and the Council of Canadians occupied a SFPR construction site for almost two weeks.

The SFPR was completed and opened to traffic on December 21, 2013 and cost C$1.26 billion.

North Fraser Perimeter Road
The North Fraser Perimeter Road (NFPR) was promoted as a way to provide a continuous route on the north side of the Fraser River from New Westminster to Maple Ridge. TransLink is responsible for the section between the Queensborough Bridge and the border of Coquitlam.

The Gateway portion of this route was to originate from the Bailey bridge across the Brunette River. The one-lane wooden bridge was to be replaced with a new four-lane crossing. The route follows United Boulevard and turns onto the Mary Hill Bypass. East of the new bridge, Lougheed Highway continues east through Pitt Meadows and Maple Ridge. The intersection at Harris Road will be converted to a full interchange.

Pitt River Bridge and Mary Hill Interchange
The new Pitt River Bridge is a seven-lane cable-stayed bridge that carries the Lougheed Highway over the Pitt River; it was built between the two swing bridges that previously performed this duty. A new interchange has replaced the at-grade intersection of the Lougheed Highway and the Mary Hill Bypass.

The old swing bridges previously accommodated four lanes of traffic, two on each bridge, with a counterflow system for peak hours. The new bridge carries three lanes of general-purpose traffic in each direction, as well as one eastbound lane for slower-moving trucks accessing the Canadian Pacific intermodal yard at Kennedy Road.

The new bridge also includes separate pedestrian and cycling walkways. The new bridge is designed to accommodate the addition of light rapid transit.

The project is being funded by the federal and provincial governments. As part of its recent Asia–Pacific Gateway and Corridor Initiative, the Government of Canada committed $90 million to the construction of the new bridge and interchange; the province provided $108 million.

The new bridge and interchange were substantially completed by the end of 2009 to coincide with the opening of the Golden Ears Bridge.

Criticism

Burnaby city council, Vancouver city council, and directors of the GVRD (now Metro Vancouver) have passed resolutions opposing the Highway 1 portion of the project.

Groups opposing the program include the Livable Region Coalition, a group based south of the Fraser called the Gateway 40 Network, a group of urban planners, the Society Promoting Environmental Conservation (SPEC), the Burns Bog Conservation Society, Sunbury Neighbourhood Association, South Fraser Action Networks, Bridgeview Community Action Group, Gateway Sucks, the Council of Canadians, and the Western Canada Wilderness Committee. These groups argue that increasing the highway's capacity will only increase traffic over the span and encourage suburban sprawl. The Livable Region Coalition urged the former Minister of Transportation,  Kevin Falcon, to consider more viable solutions to reducing congestion, including more rapid transit and improved bus routes.

The David Suzuki Foundation claims the project violates the goals of the Livable Region Strategic Plan and does not consider alternative forms of transportation.

The provincial government studies, conducted as part of the environmental assessment process, project an increase of 176,000 tonnes per year in greenhouse gas emissions. An analysis by SPEC found that these studies included emissions in Whatcom County, Washington, when calculating the baseline and left them out when calculating the impact of Gateway. When this is factored in, the studies predict a 31% increase in road emissions.

Groups supporting the project include Get Moving BC and the BC Truckers Association.

See also 
 Golden Ears Bridge

References

External links 
 Official Gateway Program website Ministry of Transportation
 The Livable Region Coalition
 Road to Ruin: Resisting the Gateway Freeway Expansion - a documentary about community resistance to the Gateway Program

Transport in Greater Vancouver
Transport in Coquitlam